Nodobryoria is a genus of medium to large, reddish-brown lichens that are hair-like to shrubby in shape and grow on conifer trees.  The genus contains three species, distributed in North America and Greenland, which were previously included in the genus Bryoria.  Nodobryoria is similar in appearance to Bryoria, but is differentiated because it does not contain the polysaccharide lichenin (which is present in high quantities in Bryoria), and it has a unique cortex composed of interlocking cells that look like pieces of a jigsaw puzzle when viewed under a light microscope.

References

External links
Picture of Nodobryoria abbreviata by Stephen Sharnoff
Picture of Nodobryoria oregana by Stephen Sharnoff

Parmeliaceae
Lichen genera
Lecanorales genera
Taxa named by Irwin Brodo
Taxa described in 1995